The Border and Coast Guard Academy (Finnish: Raja- ja merivartiokoulu, Swedish: Gräns- och sjöbevakningsskolan) is a nationally and internationally networking institution for border security and maritime SAR education and research within the Finnish Border Guard. The activities of the Border and Coast Guard Academy are divided between two education centres located in Otaniemi, Espoo and Imatra.

The Border and Coast Guard Academy is a Partnership Academy of Frontex, the European Union agency for external border security. The Academy participates in planning and organising border security training and research co-ordinated by Frontex. The special responsibility of the Academy is to train teachers and Schengen Border Evaluators.

External links
 The Border Guard

Borders of Finland